Chelis dubatolovi is a moth of the family Erebidae. It was described by Saldaitis and Ivinskis in 2005. It is found in the south-western Altai (the Belukha Mountains) and south-western Tuva (the West Tanuola Mountains) in Russia. The habitat probably consists of mountain tundra.

The wingspan is 30-32 mm. The forewings are transparent black with yellow cross lines and spots. The hindwings are transparent black with a yellow spot at the marginal edge. Adults are active during the daytime.

The larvae are probably polyphagous.

This species was formerly a member of the genus Holoarctia, but was moved to Chelis along with the other species of the genera Holoarctia, Neoarctia, and Hyperborea.

Etymology
The species is named after Russian entomologist Vladimir Dubatolov.

References

 Natural History Museum Lepidoptera generic names catalog

Arctiina
Moths described in 2005